Steve Jones is a former professional rugby league footballer who played in the 2000s.

Playing career
Steve Jones made his début for the Featherstone Rovers on Wednesday 31 January 2001.

References

Batley Bulldogs players
Featherstone Rovers players
Huddersfield Giants players
Living people
Place of birth missing (living people)
Rugby league centres
English rugby league players
Year of birth missing (living people)